There is a variety of sports in Edmonton played professionally, as amateurs, or recreationally.

Sports teams

Current teams

Baseball
Baseball in Edmonton  dates back to 1884 when the Edmonton Legislatures came to play. 27 years later in 1907 the team changed its name to the Edmonton Grays until 1909, the name had become the Edmonton Eskimos for two years. Then in 1912, they changed to the Edmonton Gray Birds for only two years. The team would change its name for the last time, back to the Eskimos for almost 35 years. Alongside the Eskimos were the Edmonton Drakes, Lloydminster Meridians, Edmonton Cubs, Edmonton Navy Cardinals Edmonton Dodgers and the Edmonton Oilers team which existed in 1964. 

Edmonton were represented in the North American League by the Edmonton Capitals in 2011, but the team has suspended operations. In 2020, the Edmonton Riverhawks collegiate baseball team was formed. The team is a member of the West Coast League. 

As a reminder of Edmonton's baseball history, a giant metal baseball bat was erected near downtown and is the largest in the world.

Edmonton Trappers

Triple-A baseball came to Edmonton in 1980 as the Edmonton Trappers playing at John Ducey Park. The Trappers became the first Canadian AAA franchise to win a pennant in 1984. They would go on and win three more titles with the most recent being in 2002 when they defeated Salt Lake City. 

In 2003, the team was sold and moved to Texas. The owners were losing money even though the Trappers were doing well in attendance. Though all of the stadiums in the league were bigger than Telus Field, the Trappers would finish 10 out of the 16 teams in attendance. 

The Trappers were affiliated with a total of six different Major teams. The first was the Chicago White Sox, then the Anaheim Angels, Florida Marlins, Oakland Athletics, Minnesota Twins, and the Montreal Expos were the Trappers last parent club before the two teams moved together in the same year. The Trappers also played their Major League affiliates twice in Edmonton. First the Angels played the Trappers at Commonwealth Stadium. The Athletics were the second team to play the Trappers. The A's  won by a score of 9–7. 

Many MLB players played with the Trappers. These players included Miguel Tejada, Randy Knorr, Jason Giambi and many others. The Trappers went on to send over 500 players to the MLB. A lot of the players who played for the team recently are in the Minors either playing with the New Orleans Zephers, the Harisburgh Senators or with another club.

Canadian football
 
Commonwealth Stadium is home to the Edmonton Elks of the Canadian Football League. The Elks hold the North American pro sports record for most consecutive playoff appearances (34 consecutive seasons) and have won the Grey Cup (the CFL championship trophy) 14 times since 1921. They are one of only four teams to win the Grey Cup after finishing third in their division in the regular season (the others being the B.C. Lions, the Saskatchewan Roughriders and the Montreal Alouettes). 

In addition to the Elks, Edmonton is host to two Canadian Junior Football League teams: the Edmonton Huskies and the Edmonton Wildcats.

Ice hockey
 
The Edmonton Oilers, originally one of the founding franchises of the World Hockey Association, joined the National Hockey League in 1979. They quickly became one of the best teams in the league, winning five Stanley Cup Championships in 1984, 1985, 1987, 1988 and 1990. Wayne Gretzky, considered by many to be the greatest hockey player ever, played with the Edmonton Oilers from 1979 to 1988. The Edmonton Oilers fell in the Stanley Cup Finals playing the Carolina Hurricanes in seven games in the Stanley Cup Final in 2006. Despite losing, they were the first eighth-seeded team to make it that far, and nearly came back to win from deficits of 2–0 and 3–1 in the series. Rogers Place has been the home of the Edmonton Oilers since 2016. 

Edmonton's involvement in hockey is not limited to the Edmonton Oilers.  Several big-time NHL names come from Edmonton and the surrounding area, such as Mike Comrie, Jarome Iginla, Ray Whitney and Fernando Pisani. Edmonton was granted a WHL expansion team, the Edmonton Oil Kings, which began playing in the 2007–2008 season.

Soccer
FC Edmonton is a soccer club that was established in 2010, having initially played in the North American Soccer League. FC Edmonton went into hiatus after the NASL folded, before joining the newly formed Canadian Premier League in 2018. The team plays its home games at Clarke Stadium.

Former teams
Edmonton was home to the Edmonton Grads, a women's basketball team with the best win–loss record of any North American team to date. The Grads defeated most American, European and Olympic challengers and compiled a record of 502 wins vs. 20 losses over 25 years, from 1915 until they disbanded in 1940 at the outbreak of the Second World War.

From 2006 to 2015, the Edmonton Rush franchise played in the National Lacrosse League. Home games were at Rexall Place. The team became the Saskatchewan Rush in 2015. 

Edmonton has an outdoor velodrome called the Argyll Velodrome.

Sporting events

A number of sporting events were held in Edmonton, including the 1978 Commonwealth Games, the 1983 World University Games (Universiade), the 2001 World Championships in Athletics, and the 2005 World Master Games.

From 2005 to 2012 Edmonton also had a circuit on the Indy Car Series known as the Edmonton Indy. This event was the best-attended event in the series. 
The city was also home to the late World Wrestling Entertainment (WWE) former World Heavyweight Champion, Chris Benoit.

From August 31 to September 17, 2006, Edmonton hosted the Women's Rugby World Cup with 12 international teams taking part for the title.

Edmonton hosted soccer matches during the 2015 FIFA Women's World Cup and is a candidate to host matches during the 2026 FIFA World Cup. Commonwealth Stadium also played host to some of the games in the 2007 FIFA U-20 World Cup.

References